Grêmio Esportivo Mauaense, commonly known as Mauaense, is a Brazilian football club based in Mauá, São Paulo state. It currently plays the Campeonato Paulista Segunda Divisão, the fourth tier of the São Paulo state league. The club was founded in 1981 and spent most of its history in the bottom tiers of the Campeonato Paulista, and has never qualified for the Campeonato Brasileiro. Known as the Locomotiva due to Mauá's status as a railway town, Mauaense had its best seasons from 1985 to 1987, when the club won the Campeonato Paulista Série A3 and played in the second division of the Paulistão for two consecutive years.

Their home ground is Pedro Benedetti Stadium, which has a maximum capacity of 11,986, although only up to 8,567 fans are allowed in by the Military Firefighters Corps.

History
The club was founded on December 15, 1981. They won the Campeonato Paulista Série A3 in 1985, and the Campeonato Paulista Segunda Divisão in 2003.

Achievements

 Campeonato Paulista Série A3:
 Winners (1): 1985
 Campeonato Paulista Segunda Divisão:
 Winners (1): 2003

Stadium
Grêmio Esportivo Mauaense play their home games at Estádio Pedro Benedetti. The stadium has a maximum capacity of 11,986 people.

References

Association football clubs established in 1981
Football clubs in São Paulo (state)
1981 establishments in Brazil